The U.S. state of Michigan first required its residents to register their motor vehicles in 1905. Registrants provided their own license plates for display until 1910, when the state began to issue plates.

, plates are issued by the Michigan Secretary of State. Only rear plates have been required since 1981. For an extra charge, drivers can request a personalized plate serial as well as a second duplicate plate. Since January 1, 2015, drivers have been required to replace their plates every ten years.

Passenger baseplates

1910 to 1970
The 1955 (dated 1956) issue was the first Michigan license plate that complied with these standards.

1971 to present

County coding

Michigan used two-letter county codes from 1940 to 1969, after using county coding blocks from 1933 to 1939. The letters I, O and Q were not used in these codes.

Optional plates

Special plates
The Michigan Secretary of State has for many years issued specialized themed vanity license plates, e.g. "Save Our Lights" with White Shoal Light, the block "M" of the University of Michigan, or "Sparty" from Michigan State University. These are available for an extra fee.

References

External links
 Michigan license plates, 1969–present
 

Michigan
Michigan transportation-related lists